The Dana/Spicer Model 30 is an automotive axle manufactured by Dana Holding Corporation. It has been manufactured as a beam axle and independent suspension axle with several versions.

General specifications
 Ring Gear measures 
 OEM Inner axle shaft spline count: 27
 GAWR up to 2770 lbs.

Dana 30 solid axles

Dana 23
The Dana Spicer 23 is an axle the Dana 30 is loosely based, with improvements throughout time. This axle was only made for the rear of vehicles.  Full floating and semi floating variations were produced.

Dana 25
The Dana Spicer 25 was based on the Dana 23 and was made only as a front axle for four-wheel drive vehicles.  This was the company's first front drive axle.

Dana 27
The Dana Spicer 27 unit phased out Dana 23 and Dana 25 units in the 1960s

Independent front suspension Dana 30 axle
Jeep Liberty 4x4 models use the Dana 30 in the form of independent suspension in the front (IFS).

The AMC Eagle front axle is also a Dana 30 IFS.

References

Automotive engineering
Automobile axles